La Cuba is a ward and  a division in the municipality of Palma Soriano, Santiago de Cuba Province, Cuba.

References

External links
 La Cuba (Palma Soriano) - EcuRed

Populated places in Santiago de Cuba Province